Jean Jacques Nicolas Huot (February 12, 1790, Paris – May 19, 1845, Versailles) was a French geographer, geologist and naturalist.

A member of several learned societies, he was a founding member of the Société géologique de France (1830). He authored various works on natural history (about fossils of animals and plants), geology and geography. He completed the "Précis de la géographie universelle" ("A system of universal geography") of Conrad Malte-Brun in 1829, which was left unfinished after the death of the Danish scholar in 1826. He also contributed the geological work "Nouveau cours élémentaire de géologie" to "Suites à Buffon", published by the library Roret. In addition, he made contributions to Nicolas Desmarest's "Encyclopédie méthodique : Géographie-physique". Late in his life, he was the curator of the library of the city of Versailles.

References 

Scientists from Paris
French naturalists
French geologists
French paleontologists
French geographers
Librarians from Paris
1790 births
1845 deaths